Taliaferro, also spelled Talliaferro, Tagliaferro, Talifero, or Taliferro and sometimes anglicised to  Tellifero,  Tolliver or Toliver, is a prominent family in eastern Virginia and Maryland. The Taliaferros (originally  , which means "ironcutter" in Italian) are one of the early families who settled in Virginia in the 17th century.  They migrated from London, where an ancestor had served as a musician in the court of Queen Elizabeth I. The surname in that line is believed to trace back to Bartholomew Taliaferro, a native of Venice and subject of the Duke of Venice, who settled in London and was made a denizen in 1562.

The origins of the Taliaferro name were of interest to George Wythe, a Virginia colonial lawyer and classical scholar, who had married Elizabeth Taliaferro, the daughter of Richard Taliaferro. Wythe urged his former student and friend Thomas Jefferson to investigate the name when Jefferson traveled to Italy. Jefferson later reported to Wythe that he had found two families of the name in Tuscany, and that the family was of Italian origin. Jefferson enclosed his sketch of the coat of arms of the Tagliaferro family as reported to him by a friend in Florence, Italy.

Etymology
Unknown to Jefferson, Taliaferro appears to arise due to a transcription error and a variation of the Italian surname Tagliaferro, which is, even today, widespread in Italy especially in Lombardy, but it also has representation in the Bolognese, Florentine, and Lazio regions. The name Tagliaferro, less common, has families in Vicenza, Gorizia, in the province of Rome and in Campania. A slight variation, Tagliafierro, is also typical of the Campania region, Caserta in particular. 

From the etymological point of view, the term tagliaferro indicates a soldier skilled in piercing the opponent or the shield of the adversary with his weapons, which cleave/slice medieval armor, such as with a stroke of ax or sword.  In reality, these surnames may also derive from the medieval name Tagliaferro, that is, the Italianization of the French name Taillefer, made famous by the chivalric epic (the name Tagliaferro, on the other hand, is also mentioned in the eighteenth-century drama La Cecchina, by Niccolò Piccinni).

People with the name

Given name
It is the first name of the following persons:
 Taliaferro Clark, a doctor during the Tuskegee Syphilis Study
 Toliver Craig, Jr., representative in the Kentucky General Assembly
 Toliver Craig, Sr. (first called Taliaferro Craig), 18th-century frontiersman and militia officer
 Taliaferro Preston Shaffner, 19th-century self-proclaimed colonel, inventor and publisher

Middle name
It is the middle name of the following persons:
William Close (William Taliaferro Close), late surgeon who worked in Africa, father of actress Glenn Close
Robert M. T. Hunter (Robert Mercer Taliaferro Hunter), U.S. Senator and Confederate Secretary of State
Booker T. Jones (Booker Taliaferro Jones, Jr.), musician, composer, frontman for Booker T. and the MGs
Sam Rayburn (Samuel Taliaferro Rayburn), 20th-century Speaker of the U.S. House of Representatives
John T. Thompson (John Taliaferro Thompson), early 20th-century U.S. Army officer who invented Thompson submachine gun
George T. Ward, (George Taliaferro Ward), planter and politician from Florida and a colonel in the Confederate army during the American Civil War 
Booker T. Washington (Booker Taliaferro Washington), postbellum African-American political leader, educator, orator, author, and ex-slave

Surname
It is the surname of the following persons:

Taliaferro
Adam Taliaferro, college football player severely injured during a game
Al Taliaferro, comic-strip artist
Benjamin Taliaferro, early 19th-century U.S. Representative from Georgia
Chris Taliaferro, Chicago alderman
Edith Taliaferro, actress
George Taliaferro, NFL player
Gabriëlle Andrée Iglesias Velayos y Taliaferro, garden designer and landscape architect
Hardin E. Taliaferro, humorist and Baptist preacher
James G. Taliaferro, 19th-century lawyer, newspaper publisher, and judge in Louisiana
James P. Taliaferro, early 20th-century U.S. Senator from Florida
John Taliaferro, antebellum U.S. Representative from Virginia
Lawrence Taliaferro, United States frontier agent
Lorenzo Taliaferro, former running back for the Baltimore Ravens 
Mabel Taliaferro, actress
Ray Taliaferro, radio host
Richard Taliaferro, colonial architect in Williamsburg, Virginia
R. Catesby Taliaferro, philosopher and mathematician
Walter R. Taliaferro, pioneer U.S. Army aviator
William B. Taliaferro, Confederate States of America general

Tolliver/Toliver
Anthony Tolliver, basketball player
Billy Joe Tolliver, football player
Charles Tolliver, musician and composer
David Tolliver, singer/songwriter/producer
Don Toliver, American rapper
Melba Tolliver, journalist
Mose Tolliver, primitive artist

Places
 Camp Taliaferro, San Diego, CA, Named for US Army pilot Walter R. Taliaferro
 Camp Taliaferro, Texas, United States, named for Walter R. Taliaferro
 T. C. Taliaferro House, Florida, United States
 Taliaferro County, Georgia, United States, named for Benjamin Taliaferro
 Willis Hall, formerly known as Taliaferro Hall, College of William and Mary, Virginia, United States
 Taliaferro Hall, University of Maryland, College Park, Maryland, United States, Named for Thomas Hardy Taliaferro. Dean/College of Engineering; Dean/College of Arts and Sciences

Fictional characters

Tulliver
Maggie Tulliver, in George Eliot's classic novel, The Mill on the Floss, a dark-complexioned miller's daughter

Tagliaferro
 Roy Tagliaferro, an alias of the serial killer Red John, in The Mentalist

Taliaferro
 Paul Taliaferro, a character in David Weber and Steve White's science-fiction novel The Shiva Option (2002)
 Peachey Taliaferro Carnehan, a character in Rudyard Kipling's short story "The Man Who Would Be King" (1888)
 Penelope Taliaferro Russell, secretary to John Joseph Bonforte in Robert A. Heinlein's Double Star (1956)
In Heinlein's The Cat Who Walks Through Walls (1985), two secret agents prepare to meet a person who uses a codename which sounds like Tolliver. One of the agents suggests that the spelling might be Taliaferro, and recites the name's convoluted etymology for the other agent.
 Roderick Taliaferro, the title character in George Cram Cook's first novel, Roderick Taliaferro: A Story of Maximilian's Empire (1903), with illustrations by Seymour M. Stone

Tolliver
 Tolliver Groat, Junior Postman, later Senior Postman and Postal Inspector in Ankh-Morpork, the fictional capital of Discworld
 Tolliver Lang, the stepbrother of the protagonist of The Harper Connelly Mysteries
 Ben Tolliver, a recurring character in the Gunsmoke radio and television series and the protagonist of the episode, "Ben Tolliver's Stud" (ep. 206×11 on television and ep. 166(46) on radio)
 Crane Tolliver, a character played by Wiley Harker on the ABC soap opera General Hospital
 Cy Tolliver, a character played by Powers Boothe on HBO's Deadwood TV series
 Jeffrey Tolliver, a recurring character in crime writer Karin Slaughter's Grant County series
 June Tolliver, the "girl" in John Fox, Jr.'s romance/Western novel, The Trail of the Lonesome Pine (1908)
 Lorenzo "Guts" Tolliver, protagonist of Jabari Asim's novel Only the Strong (May 12, 2015)
 Michael Tolliver, a gardener, who is a recurring character in Armistead Maupin's Tales of the City series
 Morton Tolliver, a character in Christopher Kenworthy's Dead or Alive: A Wild West Omnibus novel, of the Western Adventure Omnibus
 Pendleton Tolliver, a fictional character in Ted Bell's short story "The Powder Monkey", compiled in the anthology Thriller: Stories to Keep You Up All Night
 Steven Tolliver, owner of a sailing ship line in Cecil B. DeMille's film Reap the Wild Wind (1942)
Toby Tolliver, a character in early 20th-century American theatrical tent shows
 Jim Tolliver, fictional undercover Bureau of Investigation agent who pursues Ennoch “Nucky” Thompson and Eli Thompson in Season 4, Boardwalk Empire. He claims to be from Cedar Rapids, Iowa; his true name is revealed, along with details that he previously served in Army Intelligence in World War I and that his brother was a vice admiralty lawyer in Washington D.C. Jim Tolliver attended law school with J. Edgar Hoover, whom he perceived as a rival.

See also
First Families of Virginia

References

 
American people of Italian descent
American people of English descent
English people of Italian descent
First Families of Virginia
Surnames

de:Taliaferro
fr:Taliaferro
it:Taliaferro
ru:Taliaferro